Ben Wang is an American materials scientist who specializes in materials engineering, applying emerging technologies to improve the manufacturing of affordable composite materials. He is a professor at the Georgia Institute of Technology's H. Milton Stewart School of Industrial and Systems Engineering, holds the Eugene C. Gwaltney, Jr. Chair in Manufacturing, and is the Executive Director of the Georgia Tech Manufacturing Institute.

Education
Wang earned a bachelor's degree in industrial engineering from Tunghai University in Taiwan, and later master's and Ph.D. degrees, also in industrial engineering, from Pennsylvania State University.

Career
He was a Professor of Engineering, Director of the High-Performance Materials Institute, and served as Assistant Vice-President for Research in Engineering at Florida State University. In 1998, Wang founded the Florida Advanced Center for Composite Technologies.

He is a professor at the Georgia Institute of Technology's H. Milton Stewart School of Industrial and Systems Engineering, holds the Eugene C. Gwaltney, Jr. Chair in Manufacturing, and is the Executive Director of the Georgia Tech Manufacturing Institute.

Awards and memberships
Wang is Fellow of the Institute of Industrial Engineers, the Society of Manufacturing Engineers, and the Society for the Advancement of Material and Process Engineering.

Selected publications
Wang has co-authored three books: Computer-Aided Manufacturing, Computer-Aided Process Planning, and Computer Aided Manufacturing PC Application Software.

References

Living people
American materials scientists
American people of Chinese descent
American people of Taiwanese descent
Florida State University faculty
Georgia Tech faculty
Penn State College of Engineering alumni
Tunghai University alumni
Year of birth missing (living people)